Especially for You is the second album by guitarist Duane Eddy. It was released in 1959. Unlike most albums of the time, it was not built around singles but was a collection of originals and cover material that featured Eddy's guitar playing.

Track listing 
All songs written by Duane Eddy and Lee Hazlewood unless noted

"Peter Gunn" (Henry Mancini) – 2:30
"Only Child" – 3:34
"Lover" (Lorenz Hart, Richard Rodgers) – 1:41 
"Fuzz" – 2:20
"Yep!" – 2:14
"Along the Navajo Trail" (Dick Charles, Eddie DeLange, Larry Markes) – 2:36
"Just Because" (Sydney Robin, Joe Shelton, Bob Shelton) – 2:42
"Quiniela" – 5:02
"Trouble in Mind" (Richard M. Jones) – 1:51
"Tuxedo Junction" (Julian Dash, Buddy Feyne, Erskine Hawkins, William Johnson) – 2:43
"Hard Times" (Noble "Thin Man" Watts) – 2:58
"Along Came Linda" (Eddy) – 2:34

2000 re-release bonus tracks
"Only Child" [alternate take] – 2:55
"Yep!" [alternate take] – 3:04
"St. James" – 5:08
"Some Kind-a Earthquake" [alternate take] – 1:47
"First Love, First Tears" – 2:11

Personnel
 Duane Eddy – guitar

Technical
 Lee Hazlewood – producer
 Lester Sill – producer
 Eddie Brackett – engineer
 Jack Miller – engineer
 Tom Moulton – mastering
 Greg Vaughn – mastering

Chart positions

Singles

References

Duane Eddy albums
1959 albums
Instrumental rock albums
Jamie Records albums
Albums produced by Lee Hazlewood
Albums produced by Lester Sill